The Canadian federal budget for the fiscal years of 2022–23 was presented to the House of Commons by Finance Minister Chrystia Freeland on 7 April 2022.

Background 

The COVID-19 pandemic had forced the Justin Trudeau government to introduce a large number of federal aid programs to deal with the economic impact of the crisis. As a result, Canada's debt-to-GDP ratio increased in 2020 and 2021.

In March 2022, the New Democratic Party agreed to a confidence and supply deal with Justin Trudeau's Liberal Party.

Measures 

The budget's main goal is to reduce Canada's debt-to-GDP ratio, mostly through a review of all government spending.

However, the budget increases Canada's military expenditures. It also includes a limited dental care program, as promised in the Liberal-NDP deal.

Reactions 
According to political scientist David Moscrop, the budget is a fiscally conservative document that includes too few new social programs for Canadians.

Legislative history

References

External links
Budget 2022 at Department of Finance

2022
Canada